Green Township is a township in Nodaway County, in the U.S. state of Missouri.

Green Township was named after Nathanael Greene, an American Revolutionary War general.

References

Townships in Missouri
Townships in Nodaway County, Missouri